Carlos Eduardo Moreira Ferreira (9 March 1939 – 1 May 2022) was a Brazilian businessman and politician. He died in São Paulo on 1 May 2022 at the age of 83.

References

1939 births
2022 deaths
Brazilian politicians
Liberal Front Party (Brazil) politicians
Brazilian businesspeople
Members of the Chamber of Deputies (Brazil) from São Paulo
Recipients of the Order of Cultural Merit (Brazil)